A total lunar eclipse will take place on July 17, 2065. A dramatic total eclipse lasting 1 hour and 37 minutes will plunge the full Moon into deep darkness, as it passes right through the centre of the Earth's umbral shadow. While the visual effect of a total eclipse is variable, the Moon may be stained a deep orange or red colour at maximum eclipse. This will be a great spectacle for everyone who sees it. The partial eclipse will last for 3 hours and 36 minutes in total. The moon will pass through the center of the Earth's shadow.

Visibility

Related lunar eclipses

Saros series

Half-Saros cycle
A lunar eclipse will be preceded and followed by solar eclipses by 9 years and 5.5 days (a half saros). This lunar eclipse is related to two annular solar eclipses of Solar Saros 137.

See also 
List of lunar eclipses
List of 21st-century lunar eclipses

Notes

External links
 

2065-07
2065-07
2065 in science
Central total lunar eclipses